Gehrayee is a 1980 Indian horror thriller film directed by Vikas Desai and Aruna Raje based on a script by Vijay Tendulkar, Desai and Raje, and starring Anant Nag, Padmini Kolhapure, Sriram Lagoo and Indrani Mukherjee with Amrish Puri in a guest appearance. The film was produced by N. B. Kamat.

Plot
Chennabasappa is a successful manager of a reputed firm in Bangalore and lives with his devoted but docile wife Saroja, son Nandish and daughter Uma. Chennabasappa wants to build a house for his family in Bangalore and desperately needs money. He decides to sell his plantation spread across several acres in his ancestral village to a soap company. The plantation has been looked after by a very poor caretaker Baswa for many years who was Chennabasappa's loyal servant. Upon knowing Chennabasappa's intentions, Baswa becomes agitated as he considers Chennabasappa's act to be something close to the rape of one's mother. In his view, the piece of land is like one's mother (sign of fertility) that Chennabasappa sold for money.

Chennabasappa is a rationalist, who is more like an atheist and doesn't believe in anything that's beyond sensory perception. He is a hard-headed and bossy at both office and home. As the story progresses, we see Uma behaving strangely. She would speak something of Chennabasappa's unspeakable and totally unknown dark past. During one such revelation, the family members discover that Chennabasappa had seduced Baswa's wife while he was a teenager. Baswa's wife got pregnant and jumped into a well to save herself from shame.

Chennabasappa tries every medication and treatment that would bring Uma back to normal, but nothing works out. Unfortunately, the family also becomes the target of several fake exorcists, who start milking them with their evasive talks but do no good to hapless Uma. In one such instance, the family is fooled by a Tantrik Puttachari, who actually tries to harness Uma's virginity to resurrect his own devil. However, his plans fail when Nandish interrupts in between and saves Uma.

Finally the family finds peace in the hands of a mighty but sane Tantrik Shashtri, who discovers the roots of evil in Chennabasappa's house itself, a spell cast on a lemon and an ugly voodoo doll. Shashtri orders the soul inside Uma's body to reveal its identity and it is revealed that the unholy spirit was actually sent to Uma by a village Tantrik whom Baswa paid for this heinous act. Uma returns to normal after a few days.

A vengeful Nandish decides to fight Baswa and arrives at his ancestral village. He learns that Baswa died a few days earlier. Nandish begs a local Tantrik to help him meet Baswa's spirit to find answers to his questions.

Cast
 Sriram Lagoo as Chennabassapa
 Indrani Mukherjee as Saroja
 Anant Nag as Nandu
 Padmini Kolhapure as Uma
 Ramkrishna as Rama
 Rita Bhaduri as Chenni
 Amrish Puri as Tantrik Puttachary
 Sudhir Dalvi as Tantrik
 Kumar Sahu as Sabi
 Suhas Bhalekar as Baswa

Songs 
 "Rishte Bas Rishte Hote Hain" - Kishore Kumar

References

External links 
 

1980s horror thriller films
Indian horror thriller films
1980 horror films
1980 films
Films scored by Laxmikant–Pyarelal
Films directed by Aruna Raje
1980s Hindi-language films
Indian supernatural thriller films
Indian supernatural horror films